Ioan Costin Georgescu (born 25 July 1988)  is a Romanian basketball manager and the current Team Manager of CSO Voluntari.

Georgescu began writing for a sport weekly at age 15, making him Romania's youngest sports journalist at the time.

CSU Asesoft Ploiesti
At the age of 17, he becomes a press officer for CSU Asesoft Ploiești, the powerhouse of Romanian basketball. From the bottom to the top, he advanced to be team manager, delegate for the European competitions, general manager, and, at the age of 21, executive president of the club. The youngest in the European basketball!
He successfully developed many programs for the sports community, such as the Junior Academy Asesoft Ploiesti, Basketball in schools (Ploiesti won a few championships in a row in high school and gymnasium competitions, thanks to the student-athletes recruited by him and placed to study in "Caragiale" or "Mihai Viteazul" schools), the annual memorial for Toni Alexe - ex-captain of CSU Asesoft, who died in a car accident in 2005, before the team won the FIBA Europe Cup Men - and numerous fresh-marketing and PR events.

Besides his activity in the domestic competition, he was the only Romanian delegate designated to work with Euroleague Basketball, being responsible for the organization of 4 Eurocup campaigns, after his clubs won wild cards, coming from a country where basketball does not have professional status.

At the age of 27, after an unbelievable season with Asesoft Ploiești (Supercup of Romania, champions 11 times in 12 years, TOP 32 in Eurocup and amazing wins against Hapoel Jerusalem, Banvit Bandirma, Valencia, Lietuvos Rytas, Krasny Oktyabr, or Nancy), he moved to Steaua CSM EximBank Bucharest after his home team went bankrupt because of several politic issues.

Steaua CSM Eximbank
He succeeded in obtaining a Eurocup wild card with his new club for the first time in Steaua history! Two great victories in the capital of the country brought joy for the amazing red and blue crowd: against the Turkish team Trabzonspor and the Adriatic League leader at that moment, Buducnost Podgorica. From that group were part also Aris Salonic, Unics Kazan and Banvit Bandirma.

In the season 2015/2016, Steaua led the regular season and the Top 6 to finish only with the bronze medal, however the best result since 2011. Also, having a 1300 juniors program, the club took the crown for U16 and U18 categories. In the season 2016/2017, Steaua was the runner-up of the Regular Season, semifinalist of the Romanian Cup, and just 1/6 in the regular season of FIBA Europe Cup. Now, the team advanced in the Finals of the League after 21 years, but was blown out by U BT Cluj Napoca by 3-0, even the first two games in Cluj were decided in the last seconds. However, this silver medal meant a lot for the new Steaua project:

Georgescu has brought to the team from Bucharest his innovative leadership style and his fresh perspective on marketing in sports. Programs as the Hall of Fame wall, Hall of Fame museum, Blog of the Legend, Steaua Fan Zone in the biggest mall in Romania, Reading Stands Tall (collecting books at each home game together with the fans and national celebrities to make donations at the end of the season for different institutions), Live your dream and play for Steaua! (a premiere in Europe - after a 5 months interactive contest a fan signed a one-day contract with the team and he played in the National League!), Q&A with the players or various kinds of contests for the fans involving all the sponsors and partners have made Steaua CSM EximBank the number one basketball program in marketing! Photos and videos can be found on the club social media channels (Facebook: baschetsteaua, Twitter, Instagram and YouTube Channels)

BC CSU SIBIU

Georgescu signed with BC CSU SIBIU in August 2018
The club finished on 1st position the Regular Season and the Top 6 in Liga Nationala
On 19 April, BC CSU Sibiu won the Romanian Cup, after a Final against CSM Oradea 88-78. This was the first Cup in the club's history and the first trophy for Sibiu after 20 years.

Scouter for Real Betis Baloncesto

In April 2020, Georgescu reached a collaboration agreement with Real Betis Baloncesto, a club with more than 30 seasons history in the Spanish top league.
According to the Club, the partnership is aiming for a multi-year project, placing Georgescu in the scouting role for the Eastern Europe area and, in particular, in Romania. Through this collaboration, the powerful Spanish club opens its doors to the young talented Romanian players, having them under the loop, while the best ones will get a chance to be a part of the Real Betis Youth Academy. Also, the parties have in plan to organise an annual basketball camp in Romania, under the strategy and methodology of Real Betis Baloncesto.

CSO Voluntari

In July 2020, Georgescu signed a two-year deal with CSO Voluntari, a very ambitious club with a 15 years existence and a basketball section founded back in 2011.
Georgescu took the responsibility to guide the senior team as its manager, taking the ”flagship” of the club for the first season ever that Voluntari will play in the full format of the National League.
On March 9, 2021, CSO Voluntari amazed Romanian Basketball by winning the Romanian Cup 2021! In the Final 8 that took place in Cluj-Napoca, CSO Voluntari defeated FC Argeș in quarterfinals (75-74), SCM Craiova in semifinals (81-80) and CSM Oradea in the Finals (72-65) 
CSO Voluntari succeeded to defend Romanian Cup in 2022. On its way to the trophy, Voluntari defeated the power-house U BT Cluj Napoca (81-80), in the semifinals, and the host of the Final 4, SCM U Craiova (89-75), in the final game! This success shall send CSO Voluntari to BCL qualifications for the season 2022-2023!

References

External links
Article in Promovam Prahova
Article in Sport Online Ph
Article in Baschet.ro
Article in United Hoops
Article in United Hoops
Article in United Hoops

1988 births
Living people
People from Ploiești